EN1-ST05 is a first class national road on the island of Santiago, Cape Verde. It runs from the western outskirts of the capital Praia to Cidade Velha. It is 7 km long. In Praia it is connected with the Circular da Praia (EN1-ST06).

See also
Roads in Cape Verde

References

Transport in Santiago, Cape Verde
Praia
Ribeira Grande de Santiago
Road transport in Cape Verde